The Curriculum and Assessment (Wales) Act 2021 (Welsh: Deddf cwricwlwm ac asesu (Cymru) 2021) is an Act of Senedd Cymru for new curriculum requirements for all learners aged 3 to 16 in maintained or funded non-maintained nursery education in Wales.

Replacing previous curriculum and law 

 The new curriculum replaced the previous national curriculum and basic curriculum.
 The Act primarily replaces Part 7 of the Education Act 2002 which determined the previous curriculum.

Curriculum changes 

The act establishes new curriculum requirements for all learners aged 3 to 16 in maintained or funded non-maintained nursery education. The new curriculum is designed to include more emphasise on skills and experiences as well as knowledge. The curriculum groups education into six "Areas of Learning and Experience" with the intention of helping teachers draw links between subjects and teach topics in a broad way though traditional subjects will still be taught. Within a basic framework of goals and learning areas, it give schools freedom to develop their own curriculum to suit the needs of their pupils. Other changes include a greater emphasis on the history of Wales and ethnic minority groups which reports by Estyn in previous years suggested had often been poor along with the removal of parents right to take their children out of sex education classes.

References 

Education in Wales
Acts of Senedd Cymru
2021 in British law